The mile run (1,760 yards or exactly 1,609.344 metres) is a middle-distance foot race.

The history of the mile run event began in England, where it was used as a distance for gambling races. It survived track and field's switch to metric distances in the 1900s and retained its popularity, with the chase for the four-minute mile in the 1950s a high point for the race.

In spite of the roughly equivalent 1500 metres race, which is used instead of the mile at the World Championships and Olympic Games and is sometimes referred as the foremost middle-distance track event in athletics, the mile run is present in all fields of athletics, and since 1976, it is the only imperial distance for which World Athletics has on its books for official world records. 

Although the mile is not featured at any major championships, the Wanamaker Mile, Dream Mile, Emsley Carr Mile and Bowerman Mile races are among the foremost annual middle-distance races outdoors, respectively.

The current mile world record holders are Hicham El Guerrouj of Morocco with a time of 3:43.13 and Sifan Hassan of The Netherlands with the women's record of 4:12.33.

The record for the fastest mile ever run on any terrain is held by Craig Wheeler, who ran a downhill mile in 1993 in a time of 3:24; Wheeler's time is not an officially recognized record due to the downhill grade of the course he ran.

History
Although a statute mile today is equal to a length of 5,280 feet, the distance of the English mile gained its current definition of 1,760 yards through a statute of the Parliament of England in 1593. Thus, the history of the mile run began in England and it initially found usage within the wagered running contests of the 18th and 19th century. Such contests would attract large numbers of spectators and gamblers – so many that the activity became a professional one for its more-established participants.

The mile run was at the heart of the divide between professional and amateur sports in the late 19th century, as running was beginning to gain popularity in the sports world. Separate world record categories were kept for amateurs and professionals, with professional runners providing the faster times. High-profile contests between Britons William Cummings and Walter George brought much publicity to the sport, as did George's races against the American Lon Myers. The mile run was also one of the foremost events at the amateur AAA Championships. Although the spotlight was shining on the running scene, the categories remained distinct but the respective rise in amateurism and decline of the professional sector saw the division become irrelevant in the 20th century.

The mile run continued to be a popular distance in spite of the metrication of track and field and athletics in general, replacing the imperial distance for the metric mile (1500 meters). It was the 1500 metres – sometimes referred to as the metric mile – which was featured on the Olympic athletics programme. The International Amateur Athletics Federation formed in 1912 and confirmed the first officially recognised world record in the mile the following year (4:14.4 minutes run by John Paul Jones). 

The fact that the mile run was the only imperial distance to retain its official world record status after 1976 reflects its continued popularity in the international (and principally metric) era. Decades later, the distance is ubiquitous, whether run in high school gym classes or used for logging in miles for your average recreational runner.

The top men's middle-distance runners continued to compete in the mile run in the first half of the 1900s – Paavo Nurmi, Jack Lovelock and Sydney Wooderson were all world record holders over the distance. In the 1940s, Swedish runners Gunder Hägg and Arne Andersson pushed times into a new territory, as they set three world records each during their rivalry over the decade. 

The goal of completing a sub-four-minute mile sparked further interest in the distance in the 1950s and to this day, many competitive runners are still chasing the ambitious barrier. Englishman Roger Bannister became the first person to achieve the feat in May 1954 and his effort, conducted with the help of Chris Brasher and Chris Chataway, was a key moment in the rise of the use of pacemakers at the top level of the sport – an aspect which is now commonplace at non-championship middle and long-distance races. In fact, pacemakers, if performing effectively, can earn generous sums of money for their performances and accurate pacing duties.

The 1960s saw American Jim Ryun, considered one of the world's most decorated middle-distance runners, set world records near the 3:50-minute mark and his achievements popularised interval workout techniques which are still heavily used today, especially for collegiate distance runners. From this period onwards, African runners began to emerge, breaking the largely white, Western dominance of the distance; Kenya's Kip Keino won the mile at the 1966 British Empire and Commonwealth Games (which was among the last mile races to be held at a major multi-sport event as of 2021). 

Filbert Bayi of Tanzania became Africa's first world record holder over the distance in 1975, although New Zealander John Walker further broke Bayi's record a few months later to become the first man under 3:50 minutes for the event. The 1980s was highlighted by the rivalry between British runners Sebastian Coe and Steve Ovett, who improved the record five times between them, including two records at the Oslo Dream Mile race. Noureddine Morceli brought the mile record back into African hands in 1993 and Morocco's Hicham El Guerrouj set the current record of 3:43.13, which has stood since 1999.

Mile run contests remain a key feature of many annual track and field meetings, including recreational, high school, and collegiate meets, with long-running series such as the Wanamaker Mile at the Millrose Games, Dream Mile at the Bislett Games, the British Emsley Carr Mile, and the Bowerman Mile at the Prefontaine Classic being among the most prominent. Aside from track races, mile races are also occasionally contested in cross country running and mile runs on the road include the Fifth Avenue Mile in New York City. However, in high school and collegiate cross country running, races are often measured in kilometers, with 5K and 8K being the most common.

Records

Outdoor

Indoor

All-time top 25

Men (outdoor) 
 Correct as of June 2022.

Women (outdoor) 
 Correct as of July 2019.

Men (indoor)
 Correct as of February 2023.

Notes
Below is a list of other times superior to 3:50.55:
Yomif Kejelcha also ran 3:48.46 (2019).
Cooper Teare also ran 3:50.39 (2021)
Cole Hocker also ran 3:50.55 (2021).

Women (indoor)
 Correct as of February 2023.

Notes
Below is a list of other times superior to 4:22.59:
Elle Purrier also ran 4:19.30 (2022).
Laura Muir also ran 4:20.15 (2023).
Josette Andrews also ran 4:20.88 (2023).
Gudaf Tsegay also ran 4:21.72 (2022).
Konstanze Klosterhalfen also ran 4:22.59 (2022).

Youth age records
Key:

Boys

Girls

Season's bests

Men

Women

 "i" indicates performance on 200m indoor track

See also
 5 Mile - 5 mile run

References

External links
 IAAF list of one-mile records in XML

Events in track and field
Middle-distance running
Articles containing video clips